David Hine (born 1956) is an English comic book writer and artist, known for his work on Silent War and The Bulletproof Coffin.

Career
Hine has been working in comics since the early 1980s. For Crisis, he drew the series Sticky Fingers (written by Myra Hancock) in 1989, and wrote and drew a number of short pieces in 1990 and 1991.  For 2000 AD he drew Tao De Moto in 1991 (again written by Hancock) and wrote and drew the futuristic police series Mambo from 1994 to 1996.

He wrote and drew the black and white horror comic Strange Embrace, originally published as a mini-series by Atomeka Press in 1993, and later as a collected graphic novel by Active Images in the US, reprinted again as a colour series by Image Comics.

Hine is currently best known as a writer on Marvel Comics titles, like X-Men: The 198 and Civil War: X-Men. One of his projects there was Silent War a six-issue mini-series featuring the Inhumans with art by Frazer Irving. Hine has also written a number of What if? stories which look at alternate outcomes to stories like Annihilation and Deadly Genesis.

He was also the writer of Spawn for Image comics from issues # 151 to # 184 ., as well as writing his own manga series Poison Candy for Tokyopop and the Two-Face issue of The Joker's Asylum for DC. He wrote four issues of The Brave and the Bold with artist Doug Braithwaite, before J. Michael Straczynski started his run on the title and he wrote the Deathstroke one-shot, which was part of the Faces of Evil series which deals with the aftermath of Final Crisis. He wrote the Arkham Asylum one-shot for the "Batman: Battle for the Cowl" event. His one-shot lead to a mini series called "Arkham Reborn", the events lead into David Hine taking over Detective Comics continuing the story.

Hine has written two series for indie publisher, Radical Comics, FVZA: The Federal Vampire and Zombie Agency, with art by Roy Allan Martinez, Wayne Nichols, Kinsun Loh and Jerry Choo. and "Ryder on the Storm" with art by Wayne Nichols, Hugo Petrus, Feigiap Chong and Sansan Saw. From Image Comics, The Bulletproof Coffin with artist Shaky Kane.

More recently Hine has co-created Spider-Man Noir for Marvel Comics with Fabrice Sapolsky and artist Carmine Di Giandomenico and has produced graphic novels, Lip Hook and The Bad Bad Place, with artist Mark Stafford. He is currently working with Brian Haberlin on a series of independent projects including The Marked and Sonata for Shadowline/Image Comics.

In 2018 Hine wrote The Torture Garden for the Judge Dredd Megazine, and later its sequel, Deliverance.

Bibliography
Tharg's Future Shocks:
 "The Man from 2000" (art, with Oleh Stepaniuk, in 2000 AD Annual 1981, 1980)
 "Life Sentence" (script and art, in 2000 AD No. 893, 1994)
 "Riot" (art, with Vikki, in Knockabout Comics No. 3, 1981)
Big Ben (inks, with Dez Skinn, and pencils by Will Simpson, in Warrior No. 26, 1984)
 Transformers No. 75 (inks, with Simon Furman, and pencils by Will Simpson, Marvel UK, 1986)
 Spider-man and the Zoids No. 47 (inks, with Grant Morrison, and pencils by Steve Yeowell, Marvel UK, 1987)
 "Gas Masque!" (inks, with James Hill, and pencils by Brett Ewins, in Action Force No. 23, 1987)
 "Claws of the Klathi" (inks, with Mike Collins, and pencils by Kev Hopgood, in Doctor Who Magazine #136–138, 1988)
 Death's Head #2–3 (inks, with Simon Furman, and pencils by Bryan Hitch, Marvel UK, 1989)
 Sticky Fingers (art, with Myra Hancock, in Crisis #15–27, 1989)
 "Martin" (script and art, in Revolver: Horror Special, 1990)
 "Didn't you love my brother?" (art, with Tony Allen, in Crisis No. 35, 1990)
Tao De Moto (art, with Myra Hancock):
 "Forbidden Fruit" in 2000 AD #723–749, 1991)
 "Baby of the Century" in 2000 AD Yearbook 1992, 1991)
 "Up on the roof" (script and art, in Crisis No. 57, 1991)
 "Worms" (script and art, in Crisis No. 62, 1991)
The Spider (with Mark Millar and John Higgins, in 2000 AD Action Special, 1992)
 Warheads: Black Dawn No. 2 (inks, with Craig Huston, and pencils by Charlie Adlard, Marvel UK, 1992)
Strange Embrace (script and art, 4-issue mini-series, Atomeka, 1993, 8-issue limited series, Image Comics, June 2007 – January 2008, tpb, Active Images, softcover, 203 pages, July 2003, Image Comics, hardcover, 240 pages, May 2008)
Maniac 5: "War Journal" (with Mark Millar, in 2000 AD Sci-Fi Special 1993)
Dark Angel #11–13 (inks, with Bernie Jaye, and pencils by Salvador Larroca, Marvel UK, 1993)
 Mambo (script and art):
 "The New Flesh" (in 2000 AD #889–896, 1994)
 "Fleshworld" (in 2000 AD #940–947, 1995)
 "Fleshworks" (in 2000 AD #1014–1022, 1996)
Judge Dredd: "Blow Out" (art, with John Wagner, in 2000 AD No. 949, 1995)
Vector 13: "Case Nine: Spear of Destiny" (art, with Peter Hogan, in 2000 AD No. 959, 1995)
X-Men Unlimited #2: "District X" (with Adi Granov, Marvel, June 2004)
District X (Marvel Knights, Marvel, July 2004 – August 2005) collected as:
 Mr. M (collects District X #1–6, with pencils by David Yardin, Lan Medina and Mike Perkins, and inks by Alejandro Sicat, Avalon Studios and Drew Hennessy, 144 pages, January 2005)
 Underground (collects District X #7–12 and X-Men Unlimited No. 2, with art by Adi Granov, pencils by Lan Medina, and inks by Alejandro Sicat, 200 pages, October 2005)
Daredevil: Redemption (with Michael Gaydos, Marvel, April–August 2005, tpb, 144 pages, November 2005)
Mutopia X (with pencils by Lan Medina, and inks by Alejandro Sicat, 5-issue mini-series, Marvel, September 2005– January 2006, tpb, 120 pages, March 2006)
 Spawn #150–184 (with art by Philip Tan, Lan Medina, Brian Haberlin, Bing Cansino, Mike Mayhew Image Comics, 2005–2008)
X-Men: Colossus Bloodlines (with Jorge Luis Pereira, 5-issue mini-series, Marvel, November 2005 – March 2006, tpb, 120 pages, April 2006)
Son of M (with Roy Allan Martinez, 6-issue mini-series, February–July 2006, tpb, 144 pages, September 2006)
X-Men: The 198 (with pencils by Jim Muniz and covers by Juan Doe, 5-issue mini-series, Marvel, March–July 2006, tpb, collects X-Men: The 198 and X-Men: The 198 Files, 168 pages, September 2006)
Civil War: X-Men (with pencils by Yanick Paquette and inks by Serge LaPointe, 4-issue mini-series, marvel, September–December 2006, tpb, 112 pages, May 2007)
What if? (Marvel Comics):
Deadly Genesis (with pencils by David Yardin and inks by Kris Justice, February 2007, collected in What If?: Event Horizon, July 2007)
Annihilation (with art by Rafael Kayanan and Mico Suayan, January 2008, collected in What If?: Civil War, April 2008)
Inhumans: Silent War (with Frazer Irving, 6-issue mini-series, Marvel, January–June 2007, tpb, 144 pages, October 2007)
Poison Candy (with art by Hans Steinbach, Tokyopop, February 2008, 192 pages)
The Joker's Asylum: "Two-Face" (with Andy Clarke, DC, 2008)
The Brave and the Bold #19–22 (with Doug Braithwaite, DC Comics, 2008–2009)
 Faces of Evil: "Deathstroke" (with Georges Jeanty, DC Comics, 2009)
Spider-Man Noir (with co-author Fabrice Sapolsky, and art by Carmine di Giandomenico, Marvel Comics,December 2008 – March 2009)
Days Missing No. 2 (art by Chris Burnham, Archaia, 2009)
Arkham Reborn#1–3 (with art by Jeremy Haun, DC Comics 2009–2010)
FVZA: The Federal Vampire and Zombie Agency#1-3, (with art by Roy Allan Martinez and Wayne Nichols, Radical Comics, 2010)
Spider-Man Noir: Eyes Without A Face' #1–4 (co-plotted by Fabrice Sapolsky, with art by Carmine Di Giandomenico, Marvel Comics, 2010)
Detective Comics #864-#870 (writer, with art by Jeremy Haun, ongoing series, DC Comics, June 2010 – October 2010)
The Bulletproof Coffin (with artist Shaky Kane, Image Comics, six issues, June 2010 – December 2010)
The Darkness: Four Horsemen #1–4 (with art by Jeff Wamester, Image/Top Cow, 2010 – 2011)
Will Eisner's The Spirit (First Wave) #4–13, #15–16 (with art by Moritat and John Paul Leon, DC Comics, 2010–2011)
Azrael #10–18 (with art by Guillem March and Cliff Richards, DC Comics, 2010–2011)
Batman #708–709 (with art by Guillem March, DC Comics, 2011)
Batman Annual No. 28 (with art by Agustin Padilla and Andres Guinaldo, DC Comics 2011)
Detective Annual No. 12 (with art by Agustin Padilla, DC Comics, 2011)
Batman and Robin No. 26 (art by Greg Tocchini, Andrei Bressan, ongoing series, DC Comics, August 2011)
Ryder on the Storm #1–3 (with art by Wayne Nichols, Radical Comics, 2011)
The Lovecraft Anthology (10-page adaptation of The Colour Out of Space, with art by Mark Stafford, SelfMadeHero, 2011)
Elephantmen No. 41 (Writer and artist, Image Comics, 2012)
CBLDF Presents Liberty Annual (5-page Storm Dogs story with art by Doug and Sue Braithwaite, Image Comics, 2012)
The Bulletproof Coffin: Disinterred #1–6 (with art by Shaky Kane, Image Comics, 2012)
The Darkness No. 101 – 116 (with art by Jeremy Haun, Image/Top Cow 2012 – 2013)
Night of the Living Dead #1–12 (with art by German Erramouspe, Ernesto Chaparro, Tomas Aira, Avatar Press, 2012–2013)
Crossed: Badlands #14–18, #40–43, #71–74 (with art by GeorgeDuarte, Eduardo Vienna, Nahuel Lopez, Avatar Press, 2012–2015)
The Man Who Laughs (adapted from the novel by Victor Hugo, with art by Mark Stafford, SelfMadeHero, 2013)
Storm Dogs #1–6 (with art by Doug Braithwaite, Image Comics, 2013)
Edge of Spiderverse No. 1 (co-plotted by Fabrice Sapolsky, with art by Richard Isanove, Marvel Comics, 2014)
The Bad, Bad Place (with art by Mark Stafford, serialised in Meanwhile, Soaring Penguin Press, 2014-ongoing)
Think of a City page 33 (script and art, Internet art project, 2015)
Witchblade #180–181 (with art by Gabriel Riarte, Image/Top Cow, 2015)
Broken Frontier Anthology 10-page story, Quin Returns (art by Mark Stafford, A Wave Blue World, 2016)
Second Sight #1–6 (with art by Alberto Ponticelli, Aftershock Comics, 2016)
Cowboys and Insects (with art by Shaky Kane, first published digitally by Aces Weekly, 2012, published in print by Floating World Comics, 2016)
Faster Than Light: Mission Log 1 (with art by Brian Haberlin, digital online comic, Anomaly Productions, 2016)
 The Dark Judges: "The Torture Garden" (with art by Nick Percival, Judge Dredd Megazine #400–409, 2018-2019)
 Lip Hook (with art by Mark Stafford, original graphic novel, Self Made Hero,2018)
 The Bad Bad Place (with art by Mark Stafford, collection of the Meanwhile strip, Soaring Penguin, 2019)
 Sonata (with Brian Haberlin, co-author and artist, and Geirrod Van Dyke, colours. Published by Shadowline/Image Comics 2019, ongoing)
 The Marked (with Brian Haberlin, co-author and artist, and Geirrod Van Dyke, colours. Published by Shadowline/Image Comics 2019, ongoing)
 The Dark Judges: "Deliverance" (with art by Nick Percival, Judge Dredd Megazine #424–433, 2020-2021)

Notes

References

David Hine at Barney

External links

 "Waiting for Trade", Hine's blog

English graphic novelists
Living people
English comics writers
1956 births